Hydroginella wareni is a species of minute sea snail, a marine gastropod mollusc or micromollusc in the family Marginellidae, the margin snails.

Description
The length of the shell attains 5.9 mm.

Distribution
This marine species occurs off Fiji.

References

 Boyer, F., Wakefield, A., McCleery, T., 2003. The genus Hydroginella (Caenogastropoda: Marginellidae) at bathyal levels from the Fiji Islands. Novapex 4(2-3): 67-77

External links
 

Marginellidae
Gastropods described in 2003